The St. Lawrence Saints women's ice hockey program represented St. Lawrence University during the 2020–21 NCAA Division I women's ice hockey season.

Offseason

Recruiting

Regular season

Standings

Schedule
Source:

|-
!colspan=12 style="  "| Regular Season
|-

|-
!colspan=12 style="  "| ECAC Tournament
|-

2020-21 Saints

Awards and honors
Rachel Bjorgan, Adirondack Health Rookie of the Week (Awarded March 8, 2021)
 Taylor Lum, ECAC Adirondack Health Rookie of the Month (March 2021)

References

St. Lawrence Saints
2020-21 St. Lawrence Saints women's ice hockey season